Gogte or Gogate may refer to:

People 
Gogte/Gogate is a surname used by Chitpavan brahmins of the Vasishtha gotra.
Jyoti Gogte (born 1956), Indian academician
Mandakini Gogate (1936–2010), Indian writer
Raosaheb Gogte (1916–2000), Indian industrialist
Sarojini Gogte (born 1942), Indian badminton player
Shubhada Gogate (born 1943), Indian writer
Sharad Gogate (born 1936), Indian writer

Other uses 
Gogte Institute of Technology, engineering college in Belgaum, Karnataka, India
Gogte synthesis, in chemistry
Globish (Gogate), artificial language
Gogte Group, Indian conglomerate

See also